The Southern Economic Association (SEA) is a regional-based scholarly economic organization based at the University of Tennessee at Chattanooga. The SEA was founded in 1928. It is one of five general professional economic associations. For the SEA member characteristics (e.g. political affiliation, policy opinions) in relation to the other major economic associations see Klein et al.

Publications 

Along with the University of North Carolina, Chapel Hill, it publishes the Southern Economic Journal. The journal was started in 1933.

References

External links
 SEA Website
 JSTOR link for Southern Economic Journal

Economics societies
Organizations established in 1928
Wiley-Blackwell academic journals